Simone Greiner-Petter-Memm (born 15 September 1967) is a German cross-country skier and biathlete who competed from 1987 to 1997 in cross-country skiing and from 1992 to 2000 in biathlon.

She was born in Jena, as Simone Greiner-Petter, as a cross-country skier at the 1988 Winter Olympics in Calgary, Greiner-Petter-Memm finished fifth in the 4 × 5 km relay and 15th in the 20 km event. She also finished 15th in the 20 km event at the 1987 FIS Nordic World Ski Championships in Oberstdorf. Greiner-Petter-Memm's only individual World Cup victory was in a 20 km event in 1988.

Cross-country skiing results
All results are sourced from the International Ski Federation (FIS).

Olympic Games

World Championships

World Cup

Season standings

Individual podiums
 1 victory 
 2 podiums

Biathlon results
Switching to biathlon in 1992, Greiner-Petter-Memm earned a total of four individual World Cup career victories and had her best overall World cup finish of sixth in the 1993-94 season. At the 1994 Winter Olympics in Lillehammer, she earned a silver medal in the 4 × 7.5 km relay despite blowing a noticeable lead during the standing phase of her leg. Greiner-Petter-Memm missed all five of her targets and missed with her three additional bullets, which results in five 150 m penalty loops afterwards.

She also earned gold medals at the Biathlon World Championships in the 4 × 7.5 km relay event (1995–1997, 1999).

Personal life
Her husband is Silvio Memm, a former nordic combined skier.

References

External links
 . GER nationality.
 
 
 
 
 Women's 4 x 5 km cross-country relay Olympic results: 1976-2002 

1967 births
Living people
Sportspeople from Jena
People from Bezirk Gera
German female biathletes
German female cross-country skiers
Olympic cross-country skiers of East Germany
Olympic biathletes of Germany
Cross-country skiers at the 1988 Winter Olympics
Biathletes at the 1994 Winter Olympics
Olympic silver medalists for Germany
Olympic medalists in biathlon
Biathlon World Championships medalists
Medalists at the 1994 Winter Olympics
20th-century German women